Tanya McQueen (born February 18, 1972) is an American reality television personality and interior designer on the reality television series Extreme Makeover: Home Edition. She made her debut on Extreme Makeover in an October 2005 episode titled, "The Teas Family".

McQueen graduated from Texas A&M.

Prior to her Extreme Makeover: Home Edition career, she lived in Columbus, Texas.  In addition to acting, she and her cousin were flipping real estate (persons who purchase rundown houses at deep discounts, repair them, and resell them for profit) operating under the name "Tattered Hydrangea".  She was featured on TLC Network's show "Property Ladder", where an ABC producer noticed McQueen and offered her the chance to join the Extreme Makeover Home Edition team.

In 2009, McQueen hosted the series Hitched or Ditched on the CW Network.

On August 2, 2011, McQueen and fellow Extreme Makeover alum Tracy Hutson debuted the show Picker Sisters on Lifetime.

External links

References

American interior designers
Living people
People from Columbus, Texas
Place of birth missing (living people)
Texas A&M University alumni
American women interior designers
1972 births
21st-century American women